White Cone High School was a high school in Keams Canyon, Arizona, and the only high school in the Cedar Unified School District. which also includes the Jeddito elementary school. It was created in 2005 to offer a public district school in the area, as the closest public district high school is one hour away in Holbrook, and Hopi Junior/Senior High School, located within the Hopi reservation and not the Navajo Nation, is filled to capacity.

In May 2012, White Cone High School was closed, as the district's governing board voted 3–2 in February to shutter the school due to continuing financial difficulties; the facility now houses an online school known as White Cone Academy.

References

Public high schools in Arizona
Former high schools in Arizona
Education on the Navajo Nation
Schools in Navajo County, Arizona
Educational institutions established in 2005
Educational institutions disestablished in 2012
2005 establishments in Arizona
2012 disestablishments in Arizona